Neneh Mariann Karlsson (born 10 March 1964), better known as Neneh Cherry, is a Swedish singer-songwriter, rapper, occasional DJ and broadcaster. Her musical career started in London in the early 1980s, where she performed in a number of punk and post-punk bands in her youth, including the Slits and Rip Rig + Panic.

Cherry has released five studio albums under her own name. Her first, Raw Like Sushi, was released in 1989 and peaked at number three on the UK Album Chart, thanks in large part to the worldwide hit single "Buffalo Stance". Her second studio album was 1992's Homebrew. Four years later she released Man, with her next studio album, Blank Project, coming in 2014. Her most recent album, Broken Politics, was released in 2018. In addition to releasing these studio albums, she formed the band cirKus in 2006 and has collaborated with the Thing, releasing an album entitled The Cherry Thing in 2012. Cherry has won two Brit Awards and an MTV Europe Music Award (with Youssou N'Dour). She has also been nominated for a Grammy Award.

Early life and family 
Cherry was born as Neneh Mariann Karlsson in Stockholm, Sweden, the daughter of Monika "Moki" Karlsson (1943–2009), a Swedish painter and textile artist, and the musician Ahmadu Jah (1936–2018). Jah was born in Sierra Leone, West Africa, the son of a tribal chief, and went to Stockholm to study engineering at university. Her paternal grandmother was called Neneh, and her maternal grandmother was called Mariann, a name she has never been referred to as.

Cherry's parents separated early and her mother married the American jazz musician Don Cherry, who helped raise Cherry since birth. Cherry took her stepfather's surname. From her mother's side, Cherry also has a half-brother, musician Eagle-Eye Cherry. From stepfather Don Cherry's side, she has a stepsister, violinist Jan Cherry, and a stepbrother, jazz musician David Ornette Cherry. Through her father Ahmadu Jah's marriage to Maylen Jah (née Bergström), Cherry is the half-sister of singer Titiyo and record producer Cherno Jah.

In 1970, Cherry's parents, Moki and Don Cherry, bought and converted an old Swedish schoolhouse in rural Tågarp in Hässleholm. In the early 1970s, the family moved to the United States, when Don Cherry taught at Dartmouth College. In 1977 the family bought a loft in New York City in the same building as Talking Heads members Chris Frantz and Tina Weymouth whom they befriended.

Cherry dropped out of school at age 14 and moved to London.

Music career

Early career 
Cherry moved to the United Kingdom when she was 15, in the midst of the punk era, and she remembers finding "her people" there. Cherry had met Tessa Pollitt, Viv Albertine and Ari Up from the Slits earlier as her stepfather, Don Cherry, was touring with them and took the 15-year-old Neneh along. She and Ari lived in a squat in Battersea. She felt at home, after ending up there because The Slits invited Don Cherry to go on tour with them with Prince Hammer and Creation Rebel.

In London, Cherry joined the punk rock band The Cherries. She moved through several bands, including the Slits, New Age Steppers, Rip Rig + Panic, and Float Up CP. She also DJ'd, playing early rap music on the reggae pirate Dread Broadcasting Corporation. Cherry has stated that she found her voice singing along with Poly Styrene from X-Ray Spex. She grew up in a musical family; she remembers singing with her father at the piano.

Albums

Raw Like Sushi 

Cherry began a solo career in 1982 with "Stop the War", a protest song about the Falklands War. She worked with Jonny Dollar, The The and Cameron McVey (aka Booga Bear), who co-wrote most of her 1989 debut album Raw Like Sushi, and whom she later married. She was intimately involved in the Bristol Urban Culture scene, working as an arranger on Massive Attack's Blue Lines album, through which she met Dollar. Both Robert Del Naja and Andrew Vowles of Massive Attack contributed to Raw Like Sushi.

The single "Buffalo Stance" eventually peaked at number 3 in the UK Singles Chart and the US Billboard Hot 100, and number 1 on the US Dance chart. More singles released between 1988 and 1990 included "Manchild", "Kisses on the Wind", "Heart", and "Inna City Mama". She also found success with "I've Got You Under My Skin", a reworking of the Cole Porter song, which appeared on the Red Hot + Blue AIDS fundraising album. The single reached number 25 in the UK. Cherry was nominated for a Grammy Award in 1990 in the Best New Artist category (but lost to Milli Vanilli who eventually had their award revoked). She won a Brit Award in 1990 for Raw Like Sushi.

Cherry caused a press furore when she performed "Buffalo Stance" on Top of the Pops while pregnant (with her second child, Tyson).

Homebrew 

Cherry's second album was 1992's Homebrew. Homebrew was not as commercially successful as its predecessor. The album had some success on various Billboard charts with songs "Buddy X" and "Trout".

"Buddy X" reached number 4 on the Billboard Dance Club Music Charts where it spent a total of 11 weeks. The track also spent some time on Billboard′s Pop Songs Charts as well as the Hot 100 Charts, where it peaked at number 22 during its 8-week run and peaked at number 43 in its 12-week run, respectively.

The music video for "Buddy X" earned Neneh Cherry an MTV VMA nomination at the ceremony in 1993 for the Best Female Video category, alongside Janet Jackson, Annie Lennox, and k.d. lang, with lang winning the moonman.

"Trout" features additional vocals by R.E.M. singer Michael Stipe who helped to co-write the track along with Cherry, McVey, and Jonathan Sharp and contains samples of a guitar riff from Steppenwolf as well as drums by John Bonham. With airplay on college radio and increased popularity, "Trout" spent a total of 14 weeks on Billboard′s Alternative Music Charts where it reached number 2.

Homebrew also included the work of Geoff Barrow (on "Somedays"), who later became part of Portishead.

Additional recognition was attributed to remixes of track "Buddy X". First was the 1993 remix by The Notorious BIG, which is considered by some to be "one of the great Biggie rarities in the world." Cherry stated that she and McVey picked up Biggie for the studio where they remained for the session. The song was completed in one take. "Buddy X" found success yet again in the 1999 UK garage remix by Dreem Teem.

"Move with Me" was co-written by Cherry, McVey and Lenny Kravitz.

Man 

1996's Man is a solo record produced by McVey, Jonny Dollar and Christian Falk. The lead track is "Woman", her take on James Brown's 1966 track "It's a Man's Man's Man's World." It featured the worldwide hit single, "7 Seconds", featuring Youssou N'Dour; and "Trouble Man" a cover of a Marvin Gaye track. Another track, "Together Now", featured Tricky.

In France, "7 Seconds" made number one for a record 16 weeks in 1994. The song earned Cherry her second Grammy nomination and an MTV Europe Music Award for Best Song. Remixes, a French remix album of Man songs, was released in 1997.

Blank Project 

Blank Project was written by Cherry and her husband McVey. Paul Simm co-wrote six tracks on the record. The record was deeply influenced by the death of her mother.

To promote the album, she toured Europe in February and March 2014. In January 2015, Cherry performed as a solo artist in New York City. Cherry is very connected to New York, as she has visited or lived there off and on since 1966.

Broken Politics 

Broken Politics, her second album to be produced by Four Tet, was released on 19 October 2018, and has been called "quieter and more reflective" than Blank Project by Cherry. The lead single, "Kong", was released earlier in August. Writing in The Guardian, Laura Snapes labeled the album "revelatory" and gave it a 5-star review.

To support the album, Cherry toured across North America, Australia and Europe in late 2018 and early 2019.

The Versions 
On June 10, 2022, Cherry released her next studio album, The Versions. The album features reworked and reimagined versions of her previous singles. It features vocals from Robyn and Sia.

Bands/collaborations 
The Cherry Bear Collective, Cherry's former company with McVey, is now called Nomad Productions and is based in west London.

CirKus 

In 2006, Cherry formed a new band, cirKus, with Cameron McVey, Lolita Moon (Neneh and Cameron's daughter) and Karmil. CirKus toured Europe, with a single North American performance at the Montreal Jazz Festival in July 2006 plus a few dates in Brazil in 2008. The band's first album, Laylow, was released in France in 2006. A remixed/recorded version was released in 2007. A second CirKus album, Medicine, was released in France in March 2009.

The Cherry Thing 
In March 2011, Cherry collaborated with the experimental jazz group The Thing, to release the record The Cherry Thing. The Thing is a Norwegian/Swedish jazz trio, consisting of Mats Gustafsson (saxophones), Ingebrigt Håker Flaten (double bass), and Paal Nilssen-Love (drums). The Thing took their name from the third track on stepfather Don Cherry's album Where Is Brooklyn?. The album The Cherry Thing was released in June 2012 and was recorded at Harder Sound Studios in London, England and Atlantis Studios in Stockholm, Sweden.

During a 1 June 2012 interview with Kirsty Lang, broadcast as part of the BBC Radio 4's Front Row daily podcast, Cherry discussed the jazz-inspired album, saying that The Thing were inspired by Cherry's stepfather's work, but that the band makes this inspiration their own. "I think that we're taking it on, to another place. I think that's really important," Cherry said. One of the songs from the album, "Golden Heart", was written by Don Cherry; Christer Bothén, a musician who played with Don Cherry, was invited to play on the album, and brought the song to their attention.

The album includes tracks originally performed by an eclectic mix of artists, including hip-hop artist MF Doom, Martina Topley-Bird Suicide, and The Stooges'. Most of the tracks were recorded together live.

Other music projects 
Although Cherry has released only a handful of albums, she has frequently collaborated with other artists.

In 2005, she collaborated with Gorillaz on the track "Kids with Guns" from the album Demon Days.

RocketNumberNine 
In 2013, Cherry collaborated with London duo RocketNumberNine (named after a Sun Ra track), aka the Page Brothers – Ben and Tom Page – to record an album called MeYouWeYou. She also joined them to perform the entire album live at the Manchester International Festival in July 2013. The record is an album of 10 tracks that Cherry wrote with McVey, which they took with only vocals to RocketNumberNine, who then did their musical interpretation to all the tracks. They recorded the album live in Woodstock, New York, with Vortex. The 10 tracks were recorded in five days. Cherry calls it fearless and hardcore.

Musical style 
Cherry said she has never really thought of herself as a rapper. She sees herself as a "singer that does a bit of rapping."

Breaking into the U.S. music industry was not a positive experience for Cherry. She said that while "Buffalo Stance" gave her a mainstream crossover moment in the U.S. she found the American music industry stiflingly attached to labels and genre identities.

Other work 
In the early 1980s, Cherry was a DJ on DBC radio, Dread Broadcasting Corporation, a pirate radio station.

Cherry appeared in a non-singing capacity in Big Audio Dynamite's videos for "Medicine Show" (1985), and "C'mon Every Beatbox" (1986), dancing onstage with others during the band's performance. In the late 1980s, she helped bankroll the band Massive Attack

In early 2004, Cherry presented Neneh Cherry's World of Music, a six-part series broadcast on BBC Radio 2. In April 2007, she presented a six-part cookery show Neneh and Andi – Dish It Up with her friend Andrea Oliver for BBC Two. Neneh and Andi appeared on Gordon Ramsay's The F-Word as part of the amateur brigade.

In November 2013, Cherry contributed to the art project/audio book Ällp written by Lars Yngve. Singer Peps Persson contributed music, while Cherry, Björn Ranelid and a few other celebrities, all with their roots in Sweden's most southern county Skåne, recorded the book in Skånska/Scanian dialect (not "standard Swedish", aka Rikssvenska)

Cherry, a short documentary about Neneh Cherry, was released by The Face magazine on YouTube on 23 March 2022.

Personal life 
In 1983, Cherry married drummer Bruce Smith and had a daughter, Naima. They divorced in 1984. Naima is a London photographer, who had a son named Louis Clyde Flynn Love (who goes by Flynn) in 2004.

In 1986, Cherry met producer and Morgan-McVey member Cameron "Booga Bear" McVey at Heathrow Airport. Cherry and McVey were en route to Japan as fashion models as part of London designer Ray Petri's Buffalo Posse. Cherry proposed, and the couple married in 1990. Cherry and McVey have two daughters: singers Tyson, born in 1989 (also known as Lolita Moon), and Mabel McVey, born in 1996. The former (who releases singles with her name stylised as TYSON) was the daughter whom Cherry was pregnant with on Top of the Pops in 1988 and is featured in the "Manchild" video, while the latter is the singer who has collaborated on singles with Clean Bandit, Tiësto and Joel Corry.

Cherry and Cameron McVey have a collaborative work relationship: McVey produced and co-wrote Raw Like Sushi. Together they have supported a variety of British acts and they were in the group cirKus together, with Cameron McVey known as Burt Ford and Tyson as Lolita Moon during this time. Cherry has a stepson, Marlon Roudette (former frontman of Mattafix), via McVey's prior relationship with Vonnie Roudette.

The Cherry-McVeys have lived throughout Europe. In 1993, they moved near Málaga, Spain, and lived there until 1999. In 1995, they briefly lived in New York City. They bought a home in the Fort Greene section of Brooklyn. However, soon after moving, the couple was held up at gunpoint and robbed by a teenage hoodlum. The entire family packed up again and headed back to Berkley Grove in London's Primrose Hill.

They next returned to Cherry's childhood home in Hässleholm, Sweden, living in the same schoolhouse turned home (featured in Homebrew album artwork) in which Cherry was raised as a child.

The family has a country house near Birmingham and Wolverhampton, apartments in London and Stockholm, plus the family home in the old schoolhouse in Skåne County that she and her half-brother inherited when their mother died in 2009. As of 2014, Cherry says she commutes between London and Stockholm.

Style 
Since the late 1980s, Cherry has frequently worked with the stylist and jewelry designer Judy Blame.

On her street style, Cherry cites LL Cool J as an influence, as well as the photographer Jean-Baptiste Mondino, Judy Blame, and designer Ray Petri.

Discography 

 Raw Like Sushi (1989)
 Homebrew (1992)
 Man (1996)
 Blank Project (2014)
 Broken Politics (2018)
 The Versions (2022)

Awards

Brit Awards 

|-
| style="text-align:left;" rowspan="3"|1990
| rowspan="2" | Herself
| Best International Breakthrough
| rowspan="2" 
|- 
| Best International Solo Artist
|-
| "Manchild"
| Best Video
| rowspan="3" 
|-
| style="text-align:left;"|1991
| rowspan="2" | Herself
| rowspan="2" | Best International Female
|-
| style="text-align:left;"|1997

Danish Music Awards 

|-
| style="text-align:left;"|1995
| "7 Seconds"
| Best International Single
|

Grammy Awards 

|-
| style="text-align:left;"|1990
| Herself
| Best New Artist
|

Grammis 

|-
| 1990
| rowspan=2|Herself
| Best Female Pop/Rock Artist 
| 
|-
| 1993
| Best Modern Dance
| 
|-
| style="text-align:left;"|2013
| The Cherry Thing
| Jazz Recording of the Year
|
|-
| 2019
| Broken Politics
| Best Electronic/Dance
|

Ivor Novello Awards 

|-
| style="text-align:left;"|1990
| "Buffalo Stance"
| International Hit of the Year
|
|-
| 1995
| "7 Seconds"
| International Hit of the Year
|

MTV Europe Music Awards 

|-
| style="text-align:left;" rowspan="2"|1994
| "7 Seconds"
| Best Song
|
|-
| rowspan="2"|Herself 
| rowspan="2"| Best Female
|
|-
| 1996
|

MTV Video Music Awards 

|-
| style="text-align:left;"|1989
| "Buffalo Stance"
| Best New Artist
|
|-
| rowspan="2" | 1991
| rowspan="2" | "I've Got You Under My Skin"
| Best Special Effects 
|
|-
| rowspan="2" | Best Female Video
|
|-
| style="text-align:left;"|1993
| "Buddy X"
|

Music & Media Year-End Awards 

!Ref.
|-
| 1989
| Raw Like Sushi
| Debut Album of the Year
| 
|

NME Awards 

!Ref.
|-
| 2022
| Herself 
| Icon Award
| 
|

Nordic Music Prize 

|-
| style="text-align:left;"|2014
| Blank Project
| Album of the Year
|

Rober Awards Music poll 

|-
| 2012
| "Dream Baby Dream" (with The Thing)
| Best Cover Version
| 
|-
| 2014
| Herself
| Best R&B 
|

Smash Hits Poll Winners Party 

|-
| 1989
| Herself
| Most Promising New Solo Artist 
|

UK Video Music Awards 

|-
| rowspan="2"|2018
| rowspan="2"|"Kong"
| Best Styling in a Video
| 
|-
| Best Color Grading in a Video
|

See also 
 Swedish hip hop
 List of artists who reached number one on the U.S. dance chart

References

External links 

 

1964 births
Living people
Singers from Stockholm
Swedish people of Sierra Leonean descent
English-language singers from Sweden
Swedish DJs
Swedish women musicians
Swedish hip hop musicians
Swedish women rappers
Swedish singer-songwriters
Brit Award winners
MTV Europe Music Award winners
Trip hop musicians
Virgin Records artists
Swedish emigrants to the United Kingdom
Rip Rig + Panic members
20th-century Swedish women singers
21st-century Swedish women singers
Electronic dance music DJs
People from Fort Greene, Brooklyn
Swedish women in electronic music
20th-century women rappers
21st-century women rappers
Hip hop singers
Women hip hop musicians
Women hip hop singers
Smalltown Supersound artists
Women in punk